Brandon Tyler Webb (born June 12, 1974) is a former United States Navy SEAL and SEAL Sniper course Head Instructor, with one combat deployment to Afghanistan and one to the Persian Gulf. Webb is the Founder and CEO of Hurricane Group Inc, which includes sofrep.com, The Load Out Room, sofrep radio, the SpecOps Channel on YouTube, Crate Club, Cuna Dog and Continuum. Webb is also a media commentator on snipers and related Special Operations Forces military issues. Webb is a New York Times Best Selling Author who has written or collaborated on twelve books. Webb received his education at Embry Riddle Aeronautical University, and after separating from the Navy attended Harvard Business School’s OPM (Owner/President Management) program. He is a member of the New York YPO (Young Presidents Organization) chapter, Harvard Business School.

Many of Webb's statements and claims have received criticism and controversy within the special operations community.

Military career
Webb joined the Navy in 1993 and began his career as an Aviation Warfare Systems Operator and Search and Rescue Swimmer. He completed Basic Underwater Demolition/SEAL training class 215 in 1998. He was assigned to SEAL Team 3. In 2000 Webb was invited to undergo training at the SEAL Sniper Course.  After becoming a certified SEAL Sniper, he deployed to the Persian Gulf with SEAL Team 3. After his last deployment with SEAL Team 3, Webb worked at the Naval Special Warfare Group One Sniper Cell.

Works 

 The 21st Century Sniper: A Complete Practical Guide (with Glen Doherty), 2010, 
 The Red Circle: My Life in the Navy SEAL Sniper Corps and How I Trained America's Deadliest Marksmen, 2012, 
 Navy SEAL Sniper: An Intimate Look at the Sniper of the 21st Century (with Glen Doherty), 2013, 
 Among Heroes: A U.S. Navy Seal's True Story of Friendship, Heroism, and the Ultimate Sacrifice (with John David Mann), 2015, 
 The Making of a Navy SEAL: My Story of Surviving the Toughest Challenge and Training the Best, 2015, 
The Power of Thought: Core Principles to Overcome Adversity and Achieve Success, 2016, 
 The Killing School: Inside the World's Deadliest Sniper Program (with John David Mann), 2017, 
 Total Focus: Make Better Decisions Under Pressure (with John David Mann), 2017, 
 Mastering Fear: A Navy SEAL's Guide, 2018,

For sofrep.com 

 The ISIS Solution: How Unconventional Thinking and Special Operations Can Eliminate Radical Islam (with Jack Murphy and Peter Nelson), 2014, 
 Benghazi: The Definitive Report (with Jack Murphy), 2014,

For young readers 

 Navy SEALs: Mission at the Caves (with Thea Feldman), 2018,

References

1974 births
Living people
United States Navy personnel of the War in Afghanistan (2001–2021)
United States Navy personnel of the Iraq War
American military snipers
United States Navy sailors
United States Navy SEALs personnel